was a town located in Kimotsuki District, Kagoshima Prefecture, Japan.

As of 2003, the town had an estimated population of 3,480 and a density of 27.72 persons per km². The total area was 125.53 km².

On March 31, 2005, Sata, along with the town of Nejime (also from Kimotsuki District), were merged to create the town of Minamiōsumi.

External links
 Official website of Minamiōsumi 

Dissolved municipalities of Kagoshima Prefecture